Hugh Wilson (18 March 1869 – 7 April 1940) was a Scottish footballer who played for Sunderland, Third Lanark and the Scotland national football team as a wing half or inside forward.

Club career
Born in Mauchline, Ayrshire and known by the nickname 'Lalty', Wilson came to prominence with Newmilns, earning his first international cap while with that club (and their only international representative). He then signed for Sunderland and made his debut for them on 13 September 1890 against Burnley in a 3–2 defeat at Newcastle Road. Overall, he made 258 league appearances scoring 46 goals while at the club, spanning from 1890 to 1899. Wilson won league championships with Sunderland in 1892, 1893 and 1895. Known for his effective long throw-ins, anecdotally it was reported that he initially used a one-armed technique which led to the rules being changed – however, the requirement to use both hands was formalised in 1883.

Wilson left Sunderland in 1899 to sign for Bedminster. A season later he moved to Bristol City, as a result of the merger between Bedminster and Bristol City. Wilson then returned to Scotland in 1901 with Third Lanark.  He enjoyed success with Thirds, winning the Scottish League in 1904, the Scottish Cup the following year, and reaching the final in 1906. He ended his playing days at Kilmarnock.

International career
Wilson won his first cap for Scotland against Wales on 22 March 1890 in a 5–0 win at Underwood Park. He went on to make three further caps for his country, overall making four appearances scoring one goal over the course of 14 years. He also represented the Scottish League XI once, while with Third Lanark.

Personal life
Wilson's son John was also a footballer; born in Sunderland, he played solely in the Scottish League, making over 400 appearances (mainly with Hearts), also serving in the army and being wounded during World War I.

References

1869 births
1940 deaths
Footballers from East Ayrshire
Association football inside forwards
Association football wing halves
Scottish footballers
Scotland international footballers
Sunderland A.F.C. players
Bristol City F.C. players
Third Lanark A.C. players
Kilmarnock F.C. players
English Football League players
Scottish Football League players
Scottish Football League representative players
English Football League representative players
People from Mauchline